Simraungadh, Simraongarh or Simroungarh (Devanagari: सिम्रौनगढ) was a fortified city and the main capital of the Tirhut Kingdom founded by Karnat King Nanyadeva in 1097. At present time, it is a municipality of Nepal, located in Bara District, Madhesh Province. 

The archaeological exploration also shows that the part of the fortification walls are extended into Bihar, India as the city was situated on the modern-day border. The municipality was created in 2014 by agglomerating the Village Development Committees of Amritganj, Golaganj, Hariharpur & Uchidih and later on expanded the municipality areas to include Bhagwanpur, Kachorwa, Dewapur-Teta, and Bishnupur.

The city finds mention in the travel accounts of a Tibetan monk and pilgrim, Dharmasvamin (1236) when he was on his way back to Nepal And Tibet, an Italian Missionary traveler, Cassiano Beligatti (1740), Colonel James Kirkpatrick (1801) on his mission to Nepal and later used in 1835 by British ethnologist Brian Houghton Hodgson.

The city is located along the border between India and Nepal. Bhojpuri is the local language of Simraungadh.

Etymology 
The name Simraon comes from the local language Simr which stands for Simal tree found in the area. Simraongarh's relationship with the Simal forest has been also revealed by Gopal Raj Vamshavali, the oldest chronicles of Nepal.
The Tibetan monk and traveler, Dharmasavamin states Simrāongarh as Pa-ta. The word Pata is an abbreviation of last affix of Pattana''', which means a capital in Sanskrit language.

History

Simraungadh was the capital of an independent Hindu kingdom of the Mithila or Tirhut from the 11th century to early 14th century. The fortified city was built along the present-day border between India and Nepal. The rule of the Karnat dynasty marks an important milestone and a golden age in the history of Tirhut. The rise of this empire saw the birth of efficient administration, social reforms, religious and the development of local folk music and literature.

Karnat dynasty

The Simraon, Karnat, or Dev Dynasty originated with the establishment of a kingdom in 1097 CE headquartered at present-day Simraungadh in Bara district. The kingdom controlled the areas we today know as Tirhut or Mithila in India and Nepal. This region is bounded by the Mahananda River in the east, the Ganges in the south, the Gandaki River in the west, and by the Himalayas in the north. The boundary line was made between the two countries after the Treaty of Sugauli in 1816 CE.

According to French orientalist and indologist Sylvain Lévi, Nanyadeva established his supremacy over Simraungadh probably with the help of Chalukya king Vikramaditya VI. After the reign of Vikramaditya VI in 1076 CE, he led the successful military campaign over modern Bengal and Bihar.

The rulers of Simraongarh are as follows:

Invasion
Harisingh Dev (r. 1295 to 1324 CE), the sixth descendant of Nanyadeva was ruling the Tirhut Kingdom. At the same time, the Tughlaq dynasty comes to power, which ruled the Delhi sultanate and whole Northern India from 1320 to 1413 CE. In 1324 CE, the founder of the Tughlaq dynasty and Delhi Sultan, Ghiyasuddin Tughlaq turned his attention towards Bengal. The Tughlaq army invaded Bengal and on his way back to Delhi, The sultan heard about the Simraungarh which was flourishing inside the jungle. The last king of the Karnata dynasty, Harisingh Dev didn't show his strength and left the fort as he heard the news of approaching army of the Tughlaq Sultan towards the Simraungarh. The Sultan and his troop stayed there for 3 days and cleared the dense forest. Finally on day 3, the army attacked and entered into the huge fort whose walls was tall and surrounded by 7 big ditches.

The remains are still scattered all over the Simroungarh region. King Harisingh Deva fled northwards into the then Nepal. The son of Harisingh Dev, Jagatsingh Dev married the widow princess of Bhaktapur Nayak Devi.

Geography and climate
It has an average elevation of 83 meters. The Simraungdah town lies on the flat and fertile plain of Terai. In the south, the city borders Bijwani in the border of the Indian state of Bihar, while Adarsh Kotwal in the north.

Tourist attractions
Ranivas Temple and Palace

Ranivas Complex comprises 'Ranivas Temple' which is also known as 'Ram Mandir', 'Ram Janaki Mandir', 'Ranivas Palace' and 'Mahal Sarai' is located 1 Kilometer north of Simraungadh market area and 2 Kilometer north of the Indian border. The complex is spread in 600 bighas. It is one of the most visited sites of Simraungadh by local and foreign tourists. The present Ram Janaki temple is built in 1878 AD by Jagat Jung Rana, son of Jung Bahadur Rana. In 1877 AD, then Prime Minister Jung Bahadur Rana died at a place called Patharghat, Rautahat while returning from a hunting camp from Simraungadh. According to the wish expressed by his queen Hiranyagarbha Devi while going to Sati, his son built this temple in 1878 AD.

It is said and believed that this temple and present structure of Ranivas Palace is built upon the ancient palace of the Karnat dynasty. After the fall of Karntas, Oiniwar dynasty comes into the power who ruled Mithila region from 1325 to 1527 AD. It is also believed that the Maharaja of Oinwar dynasty, Siva Singh (r. 1412 - 1416), built this palace for his daughter Isri Devi during his ruling time.

Kankali Temple

Kankali Temple is a Hindu temple located in the southeastern part of the Simraungadh market area. This temple is built in the shikhara style of architecture. The idol of Kankali Mai is placed in the temple, which is made of black stone and believed to be mangled by Tughlaq armies. The date L.S. 119 (which must be in Vikram Samvat: 1340 and Common era: 1283) is engraved on the Ghanta, which is placed in front of this temple. Before the renovation of this temple, the ruin of this temple was known as "Kankali Mai Sthaan". The temple was restored in a small size by Mansaram Baba before 1816 AD and the present structure was made by his disciple, Ram Sewak Das in 1967 AD. During the festivals of Rama Navami in Chaitra, there is the presence of thousands of worshipers from Nepal and India.

Jharokhar Pokhari

Jharokhar Pokhari, 'Deutaal Pokhari' or 'Kachorwa Pokhari' is an artificial pond spread in 52 bighas (87 acres). As of 2020 AD, the pond is shrunk to 22 bighas (36 acres) due to a lack of maintenance and human encroachment.
The Jharokhar pond, which is connected to the Nepal-India border by Dasgaja, is believed to be about 800 years old and is located in Baswariya, Simraungadh. There is an Indian village, Jharokhar which is about two hundred meters south of the pond. This is one of the largest man-made spring pond of Nepal.

Ancient city plan and fortification

The ancient city of Simraungadh is enclosed within an impressive system of earthen ramparts and infilled ditches. The fortification of the ancient city has a rectangular shape and ground plan. The fortifications of Simraungadh are called Baahi''' locally and remembered as a Labyrinth. The fort is spread in 6 Kos and the main enclosure is about 7.5 km north–south and 4.5 km east–west. The eastern and western side of the fort were built over two natural embankments. The western side of the fort was dry in comparison to eatern side. The Labyrinth and the powerful defense system of the city was well planned to protect from the river floods, enemies and regulate agriculture from controlled flow of water from the ditches shows the ability of the Kingdom.

During the reign of Rama Singh Deva (r. 1227 - 1285 CE) over Simraungadh, the Tibetan monk Dharmasvamin visited the fortified city in 1236 AD on his way back to Nepal and Tibet from Nalanda. He made the following remarks regarding the palace and fortification system of Pa-ta (Simraungadh), 

After the fall and decline of the Karnat dynasty from Simraungadh, the region was either controlled by Oiniwar rulers or Makwanpur rulers until the Unification of Nepal in 1768 AD. During the period of time an Italian Missionary traveler Cassiano Beligatti, with seven other missionaries reached this place on their way to Kathmandu valley from Patna on 29 February 1740. He describes his journey on his travelling manuscript about this place is as follows,

References

External links

Populated places in Bara District
Municipalities in Madhesh Province